Two ships of the Indonesian Navy have been called KRI Diponegoro, named after the Prince Diponegoro of Hamengkubuwono, a Javanese prince who played important role in Java War, and a National Hero of Indonesia.

She was acquired in 1964 and stricken in 1973.
  is a lead ship of  launched in 2006 and commissioned in 2007.

Indonesian Navy ship names